Western School of Technology and Environmental Science (WSTES), also known as Western Tech, is a public magnet high school in Catonsville, Maryland, United States. The school's main focuses are its twelve magnet programs pertaining to specific careers. In December 2013, Western Tech was named one of six public Blue Ribbon Schools in Maryland for 2014. On September 30, 2014, Western earned its status as a National Blue Ribbon School, becoming the seventeenth school in Baltimore County since 1994 to receive this honor.

History
Western Tech opened as Western Vocational-Technical School in 1970 alongside Eastern Vocational-Technical School, constructed for about $2 million. Students attending a regular high school interested in their school's vocational training programs could attend the schools for more specialized learning in 13 courses, such as automobile mechanics or cosmetology. It accepted students from Catonsville, Woodlawn, and Lansdowne high schools.

In 1993, the school was converted from a technical school to a full high school as a magnet school, alongside several others in the county. It renamed to Western School of Technology and Environmental Science beginning in the 1993–94 school year. It continued its technical programs, with additional environmental science magnets.

On April 11, 2013, at approximately 2:30 a.m., two portable classrooms were engulfed in flames. Over 75 firefighters got the blaze under control by 3:30 a.m. Because smoke entered the main building, the school was closed that day. The cause of the fire is unknown.

Academics
Western School of Technology and Environmental Science received a 72.5 out of a possible 82.5 points (42%) on the 2018–2019 Maryland State Department of Education Report Card and received a 5 out of 5 star rating, ranking in the 99th percentile among all Maryland schools.

Western Tech is currently ranked #6 in Maryland, and #517 among high schools nationally.

Students must apply to Western Tech and the school can only accept a limited number of applicants. Therefore, the admission process is selective and competitive. Students must complete an assessment for the magnet program in which they applied to. Admission is based on these assessments among other criteria, including grades and attendance.

The programs offered are Academy of Health Professions, Automotive Service Technology, Business Management and Finance, Cosmetology, Culinary Arts and Restaurant Management, Environmental Science, Environmental Technology, Graphic/Print Communications Technology, Information Technology (with a choice between the Computer Science or Networking Pathway),  Mechanical Construction/Plumbing and Sport Science Academy.

The facilities include a state-of-the-art garage (for Automotive), kitchen (for Culinary), salon (for Cosmetology), and mock hospital (for Health Science).

In 2010, these technologically advanced programs have earned Western the title of "Best School for Hands-on Education" by Baltimore Magazine.

Western Tech currently offers 17 different Advanced Placement courses. Western also offers internships and parallel enrollment for students in the 12th grade.

Students 
The 2019–2020 enrollment at the Western School of Technology and Environmental Science was 892 students.

The graduation rate at WesternTech  was 89.25% in 1996, 94.96% in 1997, and 94.91% in 1998. From 1999 to 2011, the graduation rate has been greater than 95%. Also, over 95% of students have passed the HSA's. The student enrollment has been as high as 1,070 in 2004 and as low as 434 in 1994.

Athletics 
Western Tech does not have a field of its own, therefore sports must be played at nearby Community College of Baltimore County (CCBC) or at other schools in Baltimore County.

In 2013, the Western Tech girls basketball team won the A1 Girls State Basketball Championship, beating Dunbar High School with a score of 46–40.

Western Tech supports 14 athletic teams in Maryland Athletic Conference 1A.

Football
Soccer
Baseball
Basketball
Volleyball
Track and Field
Tennis
Softball
Lacrosse
Indoor Track
Cross Country
Golf
Badminton
Wrestling

State Championships
Volleyball:
Lesley W. Cooke Sportsmanship Award 2018
Girls Basketball
1A 2013
Girls Indoor Track
Group Events:
1A 4x200 m Relay 2008, 2013
1A 4x400 m Relay 2010, 2012, 2013
1A 4x800 m Relay 2010, 2013
1A 2010
1A 2011
2A 2014
2A 4x200 m Relay 2015
Individual Events:
1A 500m 2011, 2013
1A 800m 2011, 2013
2A 500m 2014
2A 300m 2014
Girls Outdoor Track
Group Events:
1A 4x100 Meter Relay 2007, 2008, 2013
1A 4x200 Meter Relay 2007, 2008, 2013
2A 4x200 Meter Relay 2014, 2016
1A 4x400 Meter Relay 2010, 2011, 2012, 2013
1A 4x800 Meter Relay 2010, 2011, 2012
2A 4x800 Meter Relay 2014
Individual Events:
1A 100m 2007, 2018
1A 200m 2013, 2018
2A 200m 2014
1A 400m 2011, 2012, 2013
2A 400m 2014
1A 800m 2012, 2013
2A 800m 2014
1A 1600m 2011
1A 100 Meter High Hurdles 2006, 2013
1A 300 Meter Low Hurdles 2006, 2007
1A Shot Put 2008 
Boys Outdoor Track
Group Events:
1A 2008
1A 4x100 Meter Relay 2012
1A 4x200 Meter Relay 2010, 2019
1A 4x400 Meter Relay 2008, 2009, 2010, 2013
1A 4x800 Meter Relay 2009
Individual Events:
1A 100m 1996
2A 100m 2014
1A 200m 2010, 2013
2A 200m 2014
1A 400m 2013
2A 400m 2014
2A 800m 2002
1A 3200m 2008
1A 300 Meter Intermediate Hurdles 2008, 2009
1A High Jump 2006

References

Public high schools in Maryland
Baltimore County Public Schools
Magnet schools in Maryland